The 2001–02 Minnesota Golden Gophers men's ice hockey season was the 81st season of play for the program. They represent the University of Minnesota in the 2001–02 NCAA Division I men's ice hockey season and for the 43rd season in Western Collegiate Hockey Association (WCHA). The Golden Gophers were coached by Don Lucia, in his 3rd season, and played their home games at the Mariucci Arena.

Season

Fast start
Minnesota entered the season with the highest expectations since the mid-90s, being ranked in the top-5 in both preseason polls. The team lived up to its billing and then some from the start when they downed defending finalist and #2 North Dakota and then went on a long unbeaten streak. In the game starting goaltender Adam Hauser faltered in the first and was replaced by freshman Travis Weber. Houser regained the starting role after a strong performance the following week and cemented his position when he relieved Weber after the young netminder allowed 4 goals in the first period against Michigan Tech. While the goalies were sorting themselves out, the Golden Gophers' offense was overpowering in their first 13 games. Minnesota scored no fewer than 4 goals a night and averaging 6 goals a game. The scoring was led by Jeff Taffe and Jordan Leopold but was spread across the lineup with all four lines contributing to the team's success.

Hiccup
Minnesota rode its stellar record to the #1 seed and held it until early December. The offense cooled off a bit against St. Cloud State and the Gophers lost their top ranking as a result. The team split a road series at Denver to head into then holiday break but recovered a bit by winning the Mariucci Classic. Despite winning the tournament, Minnesota dropped another spot in the rankings and slowly slipped down to #5 by failing to sweep any of the succeeding 5 weekends. During this time, the team began rotating the starting job in goal between Hauser and Weber with mixed results.

Returning to form
The Gopher offense finally regained its footing in early February and remained consistent for most of the rest of the season. The result was Minnesota going 7–1 down the stretch to finish strong. Unfortunately, the mid-season stumble cost the team a chance at a regular season title and the Golden Gophers finished 3rd in the WCHA. In the final month of the season, Hauser regain the starting role with a string of solid performances and led the team into the postseason as the #3 team.

WCHA Tournament
In spite of a scare in the second game against North Dakota, Minnesota continued their hot streak. They overpowered St. Cloud State in the semifinal to reach their first championship game since 1997. While the Gophers outshout Denver 40–27, they were stymied by a masterful performance by Wade Dubielewicz and fell 2–5.

NCAA tournament
Though disappointed at the runner-up finish, Minnesota did receive the second western seed for the NCAA Tournament and were advanced into the second round. Their first game came against conference-rival Colorado College. The Tigers got on the board first, but the Gophers got the next three goals. CC closed the gap just after the mid-point of the game but the defense closed ranks and limited the opportunities on their goal for the remainder of the match. Early in the 3rd, Barry Tallackson took a hooking call, giving Colorado College a man-advantage, but it was Minnesota's John Pohl who scored during the ensuing power play. Several more penalties were called before the end of the match, but a pair of cross-checking infractions from Alex Kim put CC at a disadvantage for most of the final four minutes and helped usher the Gophers to their first postseason victory in 5 years.

The national semifinal against Michigan wasn't any more sedate and Minnesota had to kill off six separate penalties during the game. They managed to do so and progressively built a 3–0 lead early in the third. The Wolverines would not quit, however, and scored twice to pull within a goal with 90 seconds remaining. With Minnesota playing a defensive shell, they managed to hold off Michigan and still had the lead when the buzzer sounded.

National championship
In Minnesota's first championship appearance in over a decade, they met Maine and the two fought a back-and-forth battle for the title. Minnesota got on the board in the first period on the strength of the power play goal from Keith Ballard. They held the lead for a time but couldn't extend their advantage despite three succeeding penalties by Maine. Instead, it was the Black bears who netted a power play marker early in the second frame. John Pohl wasted no time and scored to give Minnesota the lead just 51 seconds later. The Gophers continued to hold a 1-goal advantage for the rest of the period on the strength of Hauser's play. Maine tied the game a second time, just 77 seconds into the third, and continued to fire the puck on goal until a they got their first lead of the game with under 5 minutes to play. Minnesota tried to tie the game for a fourth time but the clock was quickly counting down. After an icing, head coach Don Lucia called a timeout with 58 seconds remaining and drew up a play for the team. The ensuing drew turned to a melee but the puck found its way to Matt Koalska, who shot it between Matthew Yeats' legs to the delight of the partisan crowd. Both teams had several opportunities to score in the ensuing overtime, but Minnesota got the biggest break when Maine took a tripping penalty with just over 4 minutes remaining. A minute later, Grant Potulny collected the second rebound after shots by Leopold and Pohl and fired the puck into the cage, winning the 4th national title for the program.

This was the 4th national championship team consisted entirely of American players (1949 Boston College, 1976 Minnesota, 1979 Minnesota).

Departures

Recruiting

Roster

Standings

Schedule and results

|-
!colspan=12 style="color:white; background:#862334; " | Regular season

|-
!colspan=12 style="color:white; background:#862334; " | 

|-
!colspan=12 style="color:white; background:#862334; " | 

|-
!colspan=12 style="color:white; background:#862334; " | 

|- align="center" bgcolor="#e0e0e0"
|colspan=11|Minnesota Won Series 2-0

|-
!colspan=12 style="color:white; background:#862334; " |

2002 national championship

Scoring statistics

Goaltending statistics

Rankings

USCHO did not release a poll in weeks 1, 24 and 25.

Awards and honors

Players drafted into the NHL

2002 NHL Entry Draft

† incoming freshman

References

Minnesota Golden Gophers men's ice hockey seasons
Minnesota
Minnesota
Minnesota
Minnesota
Minnesota
Minnesota